Tanyaradzwa Adel Muzinda (born 31 August 2004) is a Zimbabwean Motocross rider. She was the first woman to win a motocross championship in Zimbabwe.

Life
Muzinda was born in Harare in 2004 and she began riding a motorbike when she was five encouraged by her enthusiastic father, Tawanda. Her mother is named Adiyon and she has three siblings.

In 2017 she had a fall that damaged her hip and she had difficulty walking for several months. In the same year she competed in her first race overseas when she raced at the HL Racing British Master Kids Championships which was held at the Motoland track near Mildenhall. She enjoyed the race and came third.

Motocross championships were first organised in Rhodesia (now Zimbabwe) in 1957. No woman had ever won a championship until Muzinda won.

The African union recognised her as the junior sportswoman of the year in 2018. At the end of 2019 she and her family moved to Florida supported by Italian three times world motorcross champion Stefy Bau. Bau became her manager while her father continued as her (and two of her siblings) trainer. Muzinda is a European Union honorary ambassador for Youth, Gender, Sports and Development to Zimbabwe.

In 2021 she was named as one of the BBC's 100 Women. Her winnings have enabled her to pay school fees for 100 children in Harare.

References

2004 births
Living people
Zimbabwean motocross riders
BBC 100 Women